Garrha coccinea is a moth in the family Oecophoridae. It was described by Turner in 1917. It is found in Australia, where it has been recorded from Queensland.

The wingspan is about 20 mm. The forewings are red, slightly tinged with ochreous and without defined markings, but there are traces of two discal dots and a posterior line. The hindwings are pale-ochreous without a grey or fuscous tinge.

References

Moths described in 1917
Garrha